Lombi is a village in the municipality of Tartu, Tartu County, Estonia.

Despite its name, Vasula Lake lies within the boundaries of Lombi, not within those of the neighbouring village Vasula.

Demographics
The population recorded in censuses has been:

Neighbouring communities

References

Villages in Tartu County